The inaugural Central Europe Development Tri-Nations rugby league competition was held in 2006. This competition is organised by the Rugby League European Federation and was designed to promote the sport of rugby league in Central Europe. The competition, contested by Austria, Germany and Estonia, was won by Germany.

Results

Standings

See also

References

External links

European Shield